Felix du Plessis (1919-1978) was a  South African rugby union footballer and captain of the South Africa (Springbok) team that in 1949 beat the All Blacks thrice in succession, a feat that was not repeated by a South African side until 2009. Du Plessis's son, Morné, also captained the Springboks, the only father-son duo to have done so.

Early life and career 
Du Plessis was born on 24 November 1919 in Steynsburg, in the Eastern Cape. He was the nephew of Nic du Plessis, a Springbok who toured to New Zealand in 1921 and gained 5 caps over a three-year career.

As a 19-year-old Felix Du Plessis was selected for the first Northern Transvaal team ever, when that union was formed in 1938. His teammate and captain was Danie Craven. He enlisted voluntarily during World War II.

International career 
Felix made his debut on 16 July 1949 for South Africa as a lock in the first test match at Newlands Stadium, Cape Town against the touring All Blacks, led by Fred Allen. He was the first ever Wanderers player to become Springbok captain. Supported by vice-captain Cecil Moss, Du Plessis' team – which included Springbok greats Tjol Lategan, Hannes Brewis, Okey Geffin, and Hennie Muller – swept the series 3 – 0. Six weeks after the last test, Morné was born.

Despite his three successive test victories as captain, Du Plessis was left out of the team that faced the All Blacks in the 4th test at Port Elizabeth. He was replaced by Basil Kenyon, possibly because the player-coach's Border team had emerged unbeaten from two encounters with the New Zealanders, with a 9–0 win and a 6–6 draw. Unlike Du Plessis, Kenyon would only receive this one cap.

International caps

Personal life 
Du Plessis married Pat Smethurst, who in 1954 captained the South African women's hockey team. Their son Morné is the only Springbok captain born to parents who both captained national sports sides. The Du Plessis couple supported the more liberal opposition United Party instead of the National Party, which had come to power in 1948 and would enforce apartheid for the next 42 years.

Felix worked as a representative for South African Breweries, then relocated to Vereeniging to manage Iscor's sport and recreation department. He moved to Stilfontein, where he opened a liquor store, one of the first shops in town. Morné recalls his father as a gentle and retiring person, who only started watching his son play rugby once he was at Stellenbosch. Du Plessis died at Stilfontein in 1978 at the age of 58, having played only in the three tests against New Zealand.

See also 
 List of South Africa national rugby union players – Springbok no. 275
 Morné du Plessis
 1949 New Zealand rugby union tour of South Africa

References

1919 births
1978 deaths
People from Walter Sisulu Local Municipality
Rugby union locks
South Africa national rugby union team captains
South Africa international rugby union players
South African rugby union players
South African military personnel of World War II
Rugby union players from the Eastern Cape
Blue Bulls players